The 2011–12 Stanford Cardinal women's basketball team represented Stanford University in the 2011–12 NCAA Division I women's basketball season. The Cardinal, coached by Tara VanDerveer, and a member of the Pacific-10 Conference, won the conference's regular-season and tournament titles and advanced to the Final Four of the 2011 NCAA Division I women's basketball tournament.

|-
!colspan=7| Non-conference regular season Schedule

NCAA basketball tournament

|-
!colspan=7| NCAA tournament

External links
Official site

Stanford Cardinal women's basketball seasons
Stanford
NCAA Division I women's basketball tournament Final Four seasons
Stanford